Ronaille Calheira Seará (born March 23, 1984, in Bahia, Brazil) is a Brazilian football player who plays for Peruvian club Cultural Santa Rosa.

Attributes
A tall and gangly player with a good heading ability, Calheira plays at the striker position.

Titles

External links
 BDFA profile
 Ronaille Calheira at Footballdatabase

1984 births
Living people
Brazilian footballers
Sportspeople from Bahia
Deportes Quindío footballers
Club Universitario de Deportes footballers
América de Cali footballers
Atlético Huila footballers
The Strongest players
Yanbian Funde F.C. players
León de Huánuco footballers
Tarxien Rainbows F.C. players
C.D. Águila footballers
KF Bylis Ballsh players
Sport Áncash footballers
Peruvian Primera División players
China League One players
Kategoria Superiore players
Categoría Primera A players
Peruvian Segunda División players
Brazilian expatriate footballers
Expatriate footballers in Peru
Expatriate footballers in Colombia
Expatriate footballers in Bolivia
Expatriate footballers in China
Expatriate footballers in Malta
Expatriate footballers in the Dominican Republic
Expatriate footballers in Albania
Brazilian expatriate sportspeople in Colombia
Brazilian expatriate sportspeople in Bolivia
Brazilian expatriate sportspeople in China
Brazilian expatriate sportspeople in Malta
Brazilian expatriate sportspeople in the Dominican Republic
Brazilian expatriate sportspeople in Albania
Brazilian expatriate sportspeople in Peru
Association football forwards
CA San Cristóbal players